The title Dutch Footballer of the Year (Dutch: Voetballer van het Jaar) has been awarded in the Netherlands since 1984. The award is determined by a poll of Dutch professional footballers playing in the First (Eredivisie) and Second (Eerste Divisie) leagues.

Until 1997, it was an annual award, afterwards the prize was rewarded at the end of the football season. In 2006, the award merged with the annual prize named Golden Boot (Gouden Schoen), awarded since 1982 by the Dutch daily De Telegraaf and the Dutch football magazine Voetbal International.

Footballer of the Year

Dutch Football Talent of the Year

The title Dutch Football Talent of the Year (Nederlands Voetbal Talent van het Jaar) has been awarded in the Netherlands since 1984 for footballers under 21. The award was replaced by the Johan Cruyff Trophy (Johan Cruijff Prijs) in 2003.

Dutch Football Goalkeeper of the Year

See also
 Dutch Sportsman of the year

References
 RSSSF

External links 

 RSSSF

Eredivisie trophies and awards
Footballers in the Netherlands
Association football player of the year awards by nationality
Dutch sports trophies and awards
Awards established in 1984
1984 establishments in the Netherlands
Annual sporting events in the Netherlands
Johan Cruyff
Association football player non-biographical articles